Johanna Maria Henrica (Anneke) Levelt Sengers (born 4 March 1929) is a Dutch physicist known for her work on critical states of fluids. She retired from the National Institute of Standards and Technology (NIST) in 1994, after a 31 year career there. In 2005 Levelt Sengers was co-chair (with Dr Manju Sharma) for the InterAcademy Council of the advisory report 'Women for Science' published June 2006. She currently co-chairs the InterAmerican Network of Academies of Sciences women for science program.

Education and career
Born on 4 March 1929 in Amsterdam, Netherlands, Levelt Sengers earned candidaats (an undergraduate degree) in physics and chemistry from the University of Amsterdam in 1950, and completed her Ph.D. from the same university in 1958.

She emigrated to the United States in 1963 and joined the National Bureau of Standards (later renamed to NIST).

Awards and honors
In 1990, Levelt Sengers became a corresponding member of the Royal Netherlands Academy of Arts and Sciences. In 1992, Delft University of Technology gave her an honorary doctorate. She is a fellow of the American Society of Mechanical Engineers, the American Physical Society, and the American Association for the Advancement of Science, and a member of the National Academy of Engineering and National Academy of Sciences.
She was the L'Oréal-UNESCO Award for Women in Science 2003 Laureate for North America, and the 2006 winner of the ASME Yeram S. Touloukian Award. In 2015, the IANAS Women for Science Program announced an award for young women scientists would be named the Anneke Levelt-Senger Prize (sic) in her honor.

References

1929 births
Living people
20th-century Dutch physicists
Dutch women physicists
20th-century Dutch women scientists
Fellows of the American Society of Mechanical Engineers
Fellows of the American Physical Society
Fellows of the American Association for the Advancement of Science
Members of the Royal Netherlands Academy of Arts and Sciences
Members of the United States National Academy of Engineering
Members of the United States National Academy of Sciences
L'Oréal-UNESCO Awards for Women in Science laureates
Scientists from Amsterdam
University of Amsterdam alumni
20th-century American physicists
20th-century American women scientists
21st-century American women scientists